Penola Strait is a strait 11 nautical miles (20 km) long and averaging 2 nautical miles (3.7 km) wide, separating the Argentine Islands, Petermann Island and Hovgaard Island from the west coast of Graham Land. Traversed by the Belgian Antarctic Expedition under Gerlache on 12 February 1898. Named by the British Graham Land Expedition (BGLE), 1934–37, under Rymill, for the expedition ship Penola.

Straits of the Wilhelm Archipelago